Metallothionein-1H is a protein that in humans is encoded by the MT1H gene.

References

Further reading